K. S. Saleekha is a member of Kerala Legislative Assembly. She belongs to Communist Party of India (Marxist) and represented Shornur constituency from 2011 to 2016. She was previously elected to Kerala Legislative Assembly in 2006 from Sreekrishnapuram Assembly constituency.

Positions held
Member, CPI(M) Kerala State Committee (2022 onwards)
Member, CPI(M) Palakkad District Committee (2002 onwards)
Palakkad District Secretary, All India Democratic Women’s Association (2001-2010)
State Joint Secretary, AIDWA; Director, Kadampazhipuram Service Co-operative Bank (1988-1996) 
President, Sreekrishnapuram Block Panchayat (1995-2000) 
Member, District Panchayat, Palakkad (2000-2005)

Personal life
She was born at Pazhaya Lakkidi on 15 June 1961. She is the daughter of Saidali and Khadeeja.

References

Members of the Kerala Legislative Assembly
Communist Party of India (Marxist) politicians from Kerala
1961 births
Living people